Lardizabalaceae is a family of flowering plants.

The family has been universally recognized by taxonomists, including the APG II system (2003; unchanged from the APG system of 1998), which places it in the order Ranunculales, in the clade eudicots.

The family consist of 7 genera with about 40 known species of woody plants. All are lianas, save Decaisnea, which are pachycaul shrubs. The leaves are alternate, and compound (usually palmate), with pulvinate leaflets. The flowers are often in drooping  racemes.

They are found in eastern Asia, from the Himalayas to Japan, with the exception of the genera Lardizabala and Boquila, both native to southern South America (Chile, and Boquila also in adjacent western Argentina).

Genera

References

External links
 
 Lardizabalaceae in the Flora of North America
 Lardizabalaceae in the Flora of China
 links at CSDL
 Chilean Lardizabalaceae at Chileflora

 
Eudicot families